Knutsdotter ('daughter of Knut') is a Scandinavian name. People with the name include:

 Ingegerd Knutsdotter (1356–1412, a Swedish nun and noble
 Ingegerd Knutsdatter (born c. 1080), daughter of King Canute IV of Denmark

See also
 Knut, a Scandinavian given name